Katsiaryna Paplauskaya (born 7 May 1987) is a Belarusian athlete who competes in the 100 metres hurdles with a personal best time of 12.88 seconds (set in Lapinlahti in 2016).

Paplauskaya won the bronze medal at the 2012 European Athletics Championships in Helsinki. She has competed at 2008 Summer Olympics and 2012 Summer Olympics.

References

External links 
 

1987 births
Living people
Belarusian female hurdlers
Athletes (track and field) at the 2008 Summer Olympics
Athletes (track and field) at the 2012 Summer Olympics
Athletes (track and field) at the 2016 Summer Olympics
Olympic athletes of Belarus
European Athletics Championships medalists
People from Gomel